Father of Four and the Wolf Cubs is a 1958 Danish family film directed by Alice O'Fredericks and Robert Saaskin. The film received controversy due to a song titled "A Black Little Negro From Africa".

Cast
 Karl Stegger as Far
 Birgitte Bruun as Søs
 Otto Møller Jensen as Ole
 Rudi Hansen as Mie
 Ole Neumann as Lille Per
 Peter Malberg as Onkel Anders
 Ib Mossin as Peter
 Agnes Rehni as Naboen Fru Sejersen
 Grethe Kausland as Lille Grete (as Grete Nielsen)
 Einar Juhl as Rektor
 Holger Juul Hansen as Lærer
 Kirsten Passer as Lærerinden
 Annie Birgit Garde as Flokfører for ulveungerne
 Knud Schrøder as Dommer

References

External links

1958 films
1950s Danish-language films
Films directed by Alice O'Fredericks
Films scored by Sven Gyldmark
ASA Filmudlejning films
Father of Four